British rapper AJ Tracey has released two studio albums, one compilation album, two mixtapes, six extended plays, and twenty-four singles.

Albums

Studio albums

Mixtapes

Compilations

Extended plays

Singles

As lead artist

As featured artist

Promotional singles

Other charted songs

Guest appearances

Production credits

Notes

References

Discographies of British artists
Hip hop discographies